Eyre Coote may refer to:

Eyre Coote (East India Company officer) (1726–1783), Irish soldier and Commander-in-chief of India
Eyre Coote (British Army officer) (1762–1823), Irish-born general in the British Army
Eyre Coote (MP) (1806–1834), MP for Clonmel, son of the above
Eyre Tilson Coote, 3rd Baron Castle Coote (1793–1827), Sheriff of County Dublin
Eyre Coote (born 1857) (1857–1925), British Army Officer and Conservative candidate, Sheriff of County Dublin